Albian Afrim Ajeti (born 26 February 1997) is a Swiss professional footballer who plays as a striker for Austrian Bundesliga club Sturm Graz, on loan from Celtic, and the Switzerland national team.

He has previously played for Basel (two spells), FC Augsburg, St. Gallen and West Ham United.

Club career

Youth
The Ajeti twins started their youth football with Basel in 2005, at the same time as their elder brother moved to the club from Concordia. In the 2011–12 and 2012–13 seasons Albian Ajeti played in Basel's U-16 and with the team he twice became Swiss Champion at this level. During the 2012–13 season he also played in their U-18 team. On 30 April 2013 the twin brothers both signed their first professional contracts with the club, thus also becoming part of their first team. During the 2013–14 season he was called into their U-21 team.

Basel
Albian Ajeti played a number of test games before the 2013–14 FC Basel season and scored the winning goal in the 3–2 win against RB Leipzig on 26 June 2013 during the club's training camp in Walchensee. He spent most of the season playing with the FCB U-21 team in the 1. Liga Promotion, the third tier of the Swiss Football League, but was often called to the first team, taking a place on their substitute bench.

Ajeti made his professional debut, coming in as a substitute, on 13 March 2014 in the 2013–14 UEFA Europa League Round of 16 home tie in St. Jakob-Park. The match against Red Bull Salzburg ended in a goalless draw. At 6 April 2014, he made his league debut against FC Thun in a goalless draw in St. Jakob-Park. At the end of the 2013–14 Super League season he won the league championship with Basel. They also reached the final of the 2013–14 Swiss Cup, but were beaten 2–0 by Zürich after extra time. During the 2013–14 Champions League season Basel reached the group stage and finished the group in third position. Thus they qualified for Europa League knockout phase and here they advanced as far as the quarter-finals.

For Ajeti and for Basel the season 2014–15 was a very successful one. The championship was won for the sixth time in a row that season and in the 2014–15 Swiss Cup they reached the final. But for the third season in a row, they finished as runners-up, losing 0–3 to FC Sion in the final. Basel entered the Champions League in the group stage and reached the knockout phase as on 9 December 2014 they managed a 1–1 draw at Anfield against Liverpool. But then Basel then lost to Porto in the Round of 16. Basel played a total of 65 matches (36 Swiss League fixtures, 6 Swiss Cup, 8 Champions League and 15 test matches). Under trainer Paulo Sousa Ajeti totaled 16 appearances, 4 in the League, 2 in the Cup, as well 10 in test games. He scored 3 goals in these matches, all being in the test matches. he also played for their U-21 team.

Augsburg
Ajeti signed a four and a half year contract with FC Augsburg on 8 January 2016. Ajeti made a solitary Bundesliga appearance for Augsburg, coming on as a 54th minute substitute in a 2–2 draw against Darmstadt on 12 March 2016.

St. Gallen
In the 2016–17 Swiss Super League season Ajeti was loaned to St. Gallen on a one-year loan with the option for the club to buy the player. At the end of the season, St. Gallen signed Ajeti.

Return to Basel
On 2 October 2017, Basel announced that Ajeti had signed a five-year contract. On 14 October 2017, Ajeti scored on his debut for Basel in a 4–0 away win against Lugano. In Basel's last five games of their 2017–18 season, Ajeti scored seven goals, taking his total for the 2017–18 Swiss Super League season to 17, becoming the top scorer, with 14 goals scored for Basel. In the following season, Ajeti again scored 14 league goals for the club. Under trainer Marcel Koller Basel won the Swiss Cup in the 2018–19 season. In the first round Basel beat lower classed FC Montlingen, in the second round Echallens Région and in the round of 16 Winterthur. In the quarter finals Sion were defeated and in the semi finals Zürich. All these games were played away from home. The final was held on 19 May 2019 in the Stade de Suisse Wankdorf Bern against Thun. Striker Ajeti scored the first goal, Fabian Frei the second for Basel, then Dejan Sorgić netted a goal for Thun, but the end result was 2–1 for Basel. On 19 July 2019, in Ajeti's last Swiss Super League appearance for Basel, he scored the opening goal and assisted twice more in a 4–1 away win against Sion.

West Ham United
On 8 August 2019, Ajeti joined West Ham United signing a four-year contract for a fee of £8 million. On 27 August 2019, Ajeti made his debut, starting in a 2–0 win against Newport County in the EFL Cup.

Celtic 
Ajeti joined Celtic on a four-year deal on 13 August 2020, for a reported fee of £5 million. He made his league debut for Celtic on 22 August 2020 against Dundee United, coming on as a substitute in 73rd minute and scoring the winning goal in 83rd minute in a 1–0 win.

International career
Ajeti made appearances for the Switzerland U-15 and U-16 national teams. He played his debut for their U-17 team being substituted in during the 3–0 win against the Faroe Islands U-17 on 10 October 2012. He scored his first goal for the team just two days later during the 5–1 victory against Cyprus U-17. Altogether he played 17 games for the U-17 scoring a total of 7 goals.

Ajeti played his debut for the Swiss U-18 team on 4 September 2014 as the Swiss won 1–0 in the away game against the Swedish U-18 team in Gävle. It was Ajeti who scored the winning goal in the 88th minute. He played his debut for the U-20 national team on 31 March 2015 as the Swiss were defeated 1–0 by the Italian U-20 team.

In August 2015 Albania's coach, Gianni de Biasi declared to the Swiss media that he plans to call Ajeti for the October 2015 qualifying matches of Euro 2016.

Ajeti earned his first appearance for Switzerland on 8 September 2018, coming on as a substitute for Breel Embolo and scored his first goal in a 6–0 win against Iceland in the UEFA Nations League.

In May 2019, he played in 2019 UEFA Nations League Finals, where his team finished 4th.

Personal life
Albian Ajeti's older brother Arlind plays for Vejle BK and the Albania national team, his twin brother Adonis plays for St. Gallen.

Ajeti is of Albanian descent. He is a fluent speaker of Albanian, which he uses with his family.

Career statistics

Club

International
Scores and results list Switzerland's goal tally first, score column indicates score after each Ajeti goal.

Honours
Basel Youth
 Swiss U16 Champion: 2011–12, 2012–13

Basel
 Swiss Super League: 2014–15
 Swiss Cup: 2018–19; runner-up: 2014–15

Celtic
Scottish Premiership: 2021–22
 Scottish Cup: 2019–20 
Scottish League Cup: 2021–22

Individual
 Swiss Super League top scorer: 2017–18 (17 goals)

References

External links
 
 Albian Ajeti profile on Swiss Football League Website
 
 

1997 births
Twin sportspeople
Swiss twins
Footballers from Basel
Swiss people of Albanian descent
Living people
Swiss men's footballers
Switzerland youth international footballers
Switzerland under-21 international footballers
Switzerland international footballers
Association football forwards
FC Basel players
FC Augsburg players
FC St. Gallen players
West Ham United F.C. players
Celtic F.C. players
SK Sturm Graz players
Swiss Super League players
Swiss Promotion League players
Bundesliga players
Regionalliga players
Premier League players
Scottish Professional Football League players
Austrian Football Bundesliga players
Swiss expatriate footballers
Expatriate footballers in Germany
Swiss expatriate sportspeople in Germany
Expatriate footballers in England
Swiss expatriate sportspeople in England
Expatriate footballers in Scotland
Swiss expatriate sportspeople in Scotland
Expatriate footballers in Austria
Swiss expatriate sportspeople in Austria